Greenlandic is an Eskimo–Aleut language with about 57,000 speakers, mostly Greenlandic Inuit in Greenland. It is closely related to the Inuit languages in Canada such as Inuktitut. It is the most widely spoken Eskimo–Aleut language.

Greenlandic has been the sole official language of the Greenlandic autonomous territory since June 2009, which is a move by the Naalakkersuisut, the government of Greenland, to strengthen the language in its competition with the colonial language, Danish. The main variety is Kalaallisut, or West Greenlandic. The second variety is Tunumiit oraasiat, or East Greenlandic. The language of the Thule Inuit of Greenland, Inuktun or Polar Eskimo, is a recent arrival and a dialect of Inuktitut.

Greenlandic is a polysynthetic language that allows the creation of long words by stringing together roots and suffixes. The language's morphosyntactic alignment is ergative, treating both the argument (subject) of an intransitive verb and the object of a transitive verb in one way, but the subject of a transitive verb in another. For example, "he plays the guitar" would be in the ergative case as a transitive agent, whereas "I bought a guitar" and "as the guitar plays" (the latter being the intransive sense of the same verb "to play") would both be in the absolutive case.

Nouns are inflected by one of eight cases and for possession. Verbs are inflected for one of eight moods and for the number and person of its subject and object. Both nouns and verbs have complex derivational morphology. The basic word order in transitive clauses is subject–object–verb. The subordination of clauses uses special subordinate moods. A so-called fourth-person category enables switch-reference between main clauses and subordinate clauses with different subjects.

Greenlandic is notable for its lack of grammatical tense; temporal relations are expressed normally by context but also by the use of temporal particles such as "yesterday" or "now" or sometimes by the use of derivational suffixes or the combination of affixes with aspectual meanings with the semantic lexical aspect of different verbs. However, some linguists have suggested that Greenlandic always marks future tense.

Another question is whether the language has noun incorporation or whether the processes that create complex predicates that include nominal roots are derivational in nature.

When adopting new concepts or technologies, Greenlandic usually constructs new words made from Greenlandic roots, but modern Greenlandic has also taken many loans from Danish and English. The language has been written in Latin script since Danish colonization began in the 1700s. Greenlandic's first orthography was developed by Samuel Kleinschmidt in 1851, but within 100 years, it already differed substantially from the spoken language because of a number of sound changes. An extensive orthographic reform was undertaken in 1973 and made the script much easier to learn. This resulted in a boost in Greenlandic literacy, which is now among the highest in the world.

History 

Greenlandic was brought to Greenland by the arrival of the Thule people in the 1200s. The languages that were spoken by the earlier Saqqaq and Dorset cultures in Greenland are unknown.

The first descriptions of Greenlandic date from the 1600s. With the arrival of Danish missionaries in the early 1700s and the beginning of Danish colonization of Greenland, the compilation of dictionaries and description of grammar began. The missionary Paul Egede wrote the first Greenlandic dictionary in 1750 and the first grammar in 1760.

From the Danish colonization in the 1700s to the beginning of Greenlandic home rule in 1979, Greenlandic experienced increasing pressure from the Danish language. In the 1950s, Denmark's linguistic policies were directed at strengthening Danish. Of primary significance was the fact that post-primary education and official functions were conducted in Danish.

From 1851 to 1973, Greenlandic was written in a complicated orthography devised by the missionary linguist Samuel Kleinschmidt. In 1973, a new orthography was introduced, intended to bring the written language closer to the spoken standard, which had changed considerably since Kleinschmidt's time. The reform was effective, and in the years following it, Greenlandic literacy has received a boost.

Another development that has strengthened Greenlandic language is the policy of "Greenlandization" of Greenlandic society that began with the home rule agreement of 1979. The policy has worked to reverse the former trend towards marginalization of the Greenlandic language by making it the official language of education. The fact that Greenlandic has become the only language used in primary schooling means that monolingual Danish-speaking parents in Greenland are now raising children bilingual in Danish and Greenlandic. Greenlandic now has several dedicated news media: the Greenlandic National Radio, Kalaallit Nunaata Radioa, which provides television and radio programming in Greenlandic. The newspaper Sermitsiaq has been published since 1958 and merged in 2010 with the other newspaper Atuagagdliutit/Grønlandsposten, which had been established in 1861 to form a single large Greenlandic language publishing house.

Before June 2009, Greenlandic shared its status as the official language in Greenland with Danish. Since then, Greenlandic has become the sole official language. That has made Greenlandic a unique example of an indigenous language of the Americas that is recognized by law as the only official language of a semi-independent country. Nevertheless, it is still considered to be in a "vulnerable" state by the UNESCO Red Book of Language Endangerment. The country has a 100% literacy rate. As the Western Greenlandic standard has become dominant, a UNESCO report has labelled the other dialects as endangered, and measures are now being considered to protect the Eastern Greenlandic dialect.

Classification 
Kalaallisut and the other Greenlandic dialects belong to the Eskimo–Aleut family and are closely related to the Inuit languages of Canada and Alaska. Illustration 1 shows the locations of the different Inuit languages, among them the three main dialects of Greenlandic.

The most prominent Greenlandic dialect is Kalaallisut, which is the official language of Greenland. The name Kalaallisut is often used as a cover term for all of Greenlandic. The northern dialect, Inuktun (Avanersuarmiutut), is spoken in the vicinity of the city of Qaanaaq (Thule) and is particularly closely related to Canadian Inuktitut. The eastern dialect (Tunumiit oraasiat), spoken in the vicinity of Ammassalik Island and Ittoqqortoormiit, is the most innovative of the Greenlandic dialects since it has assimilated consonant clusters and vowel sequences more than West Greenlandic.

Kalaallisut is further divided into four subdialects. One that is spoken around Upernavik has certain similarities to East Greenlandic, possibly because of a previous migration from eastern Greenland. A second dialect is spoken in the region of Uummannaq and the Disko Bay. The standard language is based on the central Kalaallisut dialect spoken in Sisimiut in the north, around Nuuk and as far south as Maniitsoq. Southern Kalaallisut is spoken around Narsaq and Qaqortoq in the south. Table 1 shows the differences in the pronunciation of the word for "humans" in the three main dialects. It can be seen that Inuktun is the most conservative by maintaining , which has been elided in Kalaallisut, and Tunumiisut is the most innovative by further simplifying its structure by eliding .

Phonology

Vowels

Double vowels are analyzed as two morae and so they are phonologically a vowel sequence and not a long vowel. They are also orthographically written as two vowels. There is only one diphthong, which occurs only at the ends of words.

For example:

  "husband" pronounced .
  "(s)he has a husband" pronounced  and written .
  "house" pronounced .
  "(s)he has a house" pronounced  and written .

Consonants

The labiodental fricative  is contrastive only in loanwords. The alveolar stop  is pronounced as an affricate  before the high front vowel .

Grammar

Morphology

The broad outline of the Greenlandic grammar is similar to other Eskimo languages, on the morpholological and syntactic plan.

The morphology of Greenlandic is highly synthetic and exclusively suffixing (except for a single highly-limited and fossilized demonstrative prefix). The language creates very long words by means of adding strings of suffixes to a stem. In principle, there is no limit to the length of a Greenlandic word, but in practice, words with more than six derivational suffixes are not so frequent, and the average number of morphemes per word is three to five. The language has around 318 inflectional suffixes and between 400 and 500 derivational suffixes.

There are few compound words but many derivations. The grammar uses a mixture of head and dependent marking. Both agent and patient are marked on the predicate, and the possessor is marked on nouns, with dependent noun phrases inflecting for case. The primary morphosyntactic alignment of full noun phrases in Kalaallisut is ergative-absolutive, but verbal morphology follows a nominative-accusative pattern and pronouns are syntactically neutral.

The language distinguishes four persons (1st, 2nd, 3rd and 4th or 3rd reflexive (see Obviation and switch-reference); two numbers (singular and plural but no dual, unlike Inuktitut); eight moods (indicative, interrogative, imperative, optative, conditional, causative, contemporative and participial) and eight cases (absolutive, ergative, equative, instrumental, locative, allative, ablative and prolative). Greenlandic (as well as the eastern minority's Tunumisut) is the only Eskimo language having lost its dual.

Declension 

Verbs carry a bipersonal inflection for subject and object. Possessive noun phrases inflect for both possessor and case case.

In this section, the examples are written in Greenlandic standard orthography except that morpheme boundaries are indicated by a hyphen.

Syntax 
Greenlandic distinguishes three open word classes: nouns, verbs and particles. Verbs inflect for person and number of subject and object as well as for mood. Nouns inflect for possession and for case. Particles do not inflect.

The verb is the only word that is required in a sentence. Since verbs inflect for number and person of both subject and object, the verb is in fact a clause itself. Therefore, clauses in which all participants are expressed as free-standing noun phrases are rather rare. The following examples show the possibilities of leaving out the verbal arguments:

Morphosyntactic alignment 
The Greenlandic language uses case to express grammatical relations between participants in a sentence. Nouns are inflected with one of the two core cases or one of the six oblique cases.

Greenlandic is an ergative–absolutive language and so instead of treating the grammatical relations, as in English and most other Indo-European languages, whose grammatical subjects are marked with the nominative case and objects with the accusative case, Greenlandic grammatical roles are defined differently. Its ergative case is used for agents of transitive verbs and for possessors. The absolutive case is used for patients of transitive verbs and subjects of intransitive verbs. Research into Greenlandic as used by the younger generation has shown that the use of ergative alignment in Kalaallisut may be becoming obsolete, which would convert the language into a nominative–accusative language.

Word order
In transitive clauses whose object and subject are expressed as free noun phrases, the basic pragmatically-neutral word order is SOV / SOXV in which X is a noun phrase in one of the oblique cases. However, word order is fairly free. Topical noun phrases occur at the beginning of a clause. New or emphasized information generally come last, which is usually the verb but can also be a focal subject or object. As well, in the spoken language, "afterthought" material or clarifications may follow the verb, usually in a lowered pitch.

On the other hand, the noun phrase is characterized by a rigid order in which the head of the phrase precedes any modifiers and the possessor precedes the possessed.

In copula clauses, the word order is usually subject-copula-complement.

An attribute appears after its head noun.

An attribute of an incorporated noun appears after the verb:

Coordination and subordination 
Syntactic coordination and subordination is built by combining predicates in the superordinate moods (indicative, interrogative, imperative and optative) with predicates in the subordinate moods (conditional, causative, contemporative and participial). The contemporative has both coordinative and subordinative functions, depending on the context. The relative order of the main clause and its coordinate or subordinate clauses is relatively free and is subject mostly to pragmatic concerns.

Obviation and switch-reference
The Greenlandic pronominal system includes a distinction known as obviation or switch-reference. There is a special so-called fourth person to denote a third person subject of a subordinate verb or the possessor of a noun that is coreferent with the third person subject of the matrix clause. Here are examples of the difference between third and the fourth persons:

{|
! width="50%" | third person
|
! width="50%" | fourth person
|-
| 
|
| 
|-
| 
|
| 
|-
| 
|
| 
|}

Indefiniteness construction
There is no category of definiteness in Greenlandic and so information on whether participants are already known to the listener or they are new to the discourse is encoded by other means. According to some authors, morphology related to transitivity such as the use of the construction sometimes called antipassive or intransitive object conveys such meaning, along with strategies of noun incorporation of non-topical noun phrases. That view, however, is controversial.

Verbs 
The morphology of Greenlandic verbs is enormously complex. The main processes are inflection and derivation. Inflectional morphology includes the processes of obligatory inflection for mood, person and voice (tense and aspect are not inflectional categories in Kalaallisut). Derivational morphology modifies the meaning of verbs similarly to English adverbs. There are hundreds of such derivational suffixes. Many of them are so semantically salient and so they are often referred to as postbases, rather than suffixes, particularly in the American tradition of Eskimo grammar. Such semantically "heavy" suffixes may express concepts such as "to have", "to be", "to say" or "to think". The Greenlandic verb word consists of a root, followed by derivational suffixes/postbases and then inflectional suffixes. Tense and aspect are marked by optional suffixes between the derivational and the inflectional suffixes.

Inflection 
Greenlandic verbs inflect for agreement with agent and patient and for mood and for voice. There are eight moods, four of which are used in independent clauses the others in subordinate clauses. The four independent moods are indicative, interrogative, imperative and optative. The four dependent moods are causative, conditional, contemporative and participial. Verbal roots can take transitive, intransitive or negative inflections and so all eight mood suffixes have those three forms. The inflectional system is even more complex since transitive suffixes encode both agent and patient in a single morpheme, with up to 48 different suffixes covering all possible combinations of agent and patient for each of the eight transitive paradigms. As some moods do not have forms for all persons (imperative has only 2nd person, optative has only 1st and 3rd person, participial mood has no 4th person and contemporative has no 3rd person), the total number of verbal inflectional suffixes is about 318.

Indicative and interrogative moods 
The indicative mood is used in all independent expository clauses. The interrogative mood is used for questions that do not have the question particle immaqa "maybe".

The table below shows the intransitive inflection of the verb neri- "to eat" in the indicative and interrogative moods (question marks mark interrogative intonation; questions have falling intonation on the last syllable, unlike English and most other Indo-European languages, whose questions are marked by rising intonation). Both the indicative and the interrogative mood have a transitive and an intransitive inflection, but only the intransitive inflection is given here. Consonant gradation like in Finnish appears to occur in the verb conjugation (with strengthening to pp in the 3rd person plural and weakening to v elsewhere).

The table below shows the transitive indicative inflection for 1st, 2nd, and 3rd person singular subjects of the verb asa- "to love" (an asterisk means that the form does not occur as such but uses a different reflexive inflection).

The table below gives the basic form of all the inflexional suffixes in the indicative and interrogative moods. Where the indicative and interrogative forms differ, the interrogative form is given second in brackets. Suffixes used with intransitive verbs are in italics, while suffixes used with transitive verbs are unmarked.

Apart from the similarities between forms highlighted in bold, it will be observed that all basic forms start with v- except for the 3rd person plural intransitive forms, that all basic transitive indicative forms have  as their first vowel, that all basic intransitive indicative forms have  as their first vowel (voq is phonemically ), and that all basic forms unique to the interrogative mood have  as their first vowel except for the 3rd person intransitive forms. Furthermore, if the subject of a transitive verb is 3rd person, the suffix will start with vaa- (with one exception). In the forms unique to the interrogative transitive (which all have 2nd person subjects), the forms with a (2nd person) singular subject are turned into forms with a (2nd person) plural subject by adding -si- after the initial vi- (except when the object is 1st person plural, in which case the same form is used for both plural and singular subject, as is the case for all indicative and interrogative forms with the object in the 1st or 2nd person plural). When the object is 1st or 2nd person singular, the forms with a 3rd person singular subject are turned into forms with a (3rd person) plural subject by lengthening the second consonant:  → ,  → . If the subject or object is 2nd person plural, the suffix will include -si(-). If the subject or object is 1st person plural, the suffix will end in -t except when the object is 2nd person plural.

The interrogative mood has separate forms only when the subject is 2nd person or intransitive 3rd person; otherwise, the interrogative forms are identical to the indicative forms. All suffixes that start with vi- have a subject in the 2nd person.

The initial v- changes to p- or is deleted according to the rules described above.

The intransitive 2nd person does not have separate interrogative forms after -nngil-, hence e.g. suli+vutit ‘you (sg.) work’, suli-nngil+atit ‘you (sg.) don't work’, suli+vit? ‘do you (sg.) work?’, suli-nngil+atit? ‘don't you (sg.) work?’ (instead of the expected *suli-nngil+it?).

After the future suffix -ssa-, vu- and vo- (both ) change to a-. (Va-, vi-, ppu-, and ppa- do not change.)

After the suffix -qa- ‘very’, vu-, vo-, va-, vi-, ppu-, and ppa- all change to a- (except when this would lead to aaa, in which case aaa is shortened to aa). -qa- + vai becomes qai, not *qaai. (In accordance with the rule, aau becomes aaju, hence -qa- + viuk becomes qaajuk, not *qaauk.) The suffix -qa- was historically -qi-.

Imperative and optative moods 
The imperative mood is used to issue orders and is always combined with the second person. The optative is used to express wishes or exhortations and is never used with the second person. There is a negative imperative form used to issue prohibitions. Both optative and imperative have transitive and intransitive paradigms. There are two transitive positive imperative paradigms: a standard one and another that is considered rude and is used usually to address children.

Conditional mood 
The conditional mood is used to construct subordinate clauses that mean "if" or "when".

Causative mood 
The causative mood (sometimes called the conjunctive) is used to construct subordinate clauses that mean "because", "since" or "when" and is also sometimes used to mean "that". The causative is used also in main clauses to imply some underlying cause.

Contemporative mood 
The contemporative mood is used to construct subordinate clauses with the meaning of simultaneity and is used only if the subject of the subordinate clause and of the main clause are identical. If they differ, the participial mood or the causative mood is used. The contemporative can also be used to form complement clauses for verbs of speaking or thinking.

Participial mood 
The participial mood is used to construct a subordinate clause describing its subject in the state of carrying out an activity. It is used when the matrix clause and the subordinate clause have different subjects. It is often used in appositional phrases such as relative clauses.

Derivation 
Verbal derivation is extremely productive, and Greenlandic has many hundreds of derivational suffixes. Often, a single verb uses more than one derivational suffix, resulting in very long words. Here are some examples of how derivational suffixes can change the meaning of verbs:

Time reference and aspect 
Greenlandic grammar has morphological devices to mark a distinction between the recent and distant past, but their use is optional and so they should be understood as parts of Greenlandic's extensive derivational system, rather than as a system of tense-markers. Rather than by morphological marking, fixed temporal distance is expressed by temporal adverbials:

All other things being equal and in the absence of any explicit adverbials, the indicative mood is interpreted as complete or incomplete, depending on the verbal lexical aspect.

However, if a sentence with an atelic verbal phrase is embedded within the context of a past-time narrative, it would be interpreted as past.

Also, there are at least two major perfect markers: sima and nikuu. sima can occur in several positions with obviously-different functions. The last position indicates evidential meaning, but that can be determined only if several suffixes are present.

With atelic verbs, there is a regular contrast between indirective evidentiality, marked by sima, and witnessed evidentiality, marked by nikuu. Its evidential meaning causes the combination of first person and sima to be sometimes marked.

In the written language and more recently also in the spoken language, especially by younger speakers, sima and nikuu can be used together with adverbials to refer to a particular time in the past. That is, they can arguably mark time reference but do not yet do so systematically.

Just as Greenlandic does not systematically mark past tense, the language also does not have a future tense. Rather, it employs three different strategies to express future meaning:

The status of the perfect markers as aspect is not very controversial, but some scholars have claimed that Greenlandic has a basic temporal distinction between future and nonfuture. Especially, the suffix -ssa and handful of other suffixes have been claimed to be obligatory future markers. However, at least for literary Greenlandic, the suffixes have been shown to have other semantics, which can be used to refer to the future by the strategies that have just been described.

Voice
Greenlandic has an antipassive voice, which transforms the ergative subject into an absolutive subject and the absolutive object into an instrumental argument; it is formed mostly by the addition of the marker -(s)i- to the verb (the presence of the consonant being mostly phonologically determined, albeit with a few cases of lexically determined distribution) and, in small lexically restricted sets of verbs, by the addition of -nnig- or -ller- (the former being, however, more frequent because it is the one selected by the common verbal element -gi/ri- 'to have as'). It has also been analysed as having passive voice constructions, which are formed with the elements  -saa- (composed of the passive participle suffix -sa- and -u- 'to be'), -neqar- (composed of the verbal noun suffix -neq- and -qar- 'to have') and -tit- (only to demote higher animate participants, also used with a reflexive causative meaning 'to cause, let [someone do something to one]'). In addition, an "impersonal passive" from intransitive verbs -toqar- (composed of intransitive agent suffix -toq- and -qar 'to have') has been identified.

Noun incorporation 
There is also a debate in the linguistic literature on whether Greenlandic has noun incorporation. The language does not allow the kind of incorporation that common in many other languages in which a noun root can be incorporated into almost any verb to form a verb with a new meaning. On the other hand, Greenlandic often forms verbs that include noun roots. The question then becomes whether to analyse such verb formations as incorporation or as denominal derivation of verbs. Greenlandic has a number of morphemes that require a noun root as their host and form complex predicates, which correspond closely in meaning to what is often seen in languages that have canonical noun incorporation. Linguists who propose that Greenlandic had incorporation argue that such morphemes are in fact verbal roots, which must incorporate nouns to form grammatical clauses. That argument is supported by the fact that many of the derivational morphemes that form denominal verbs work almost identically to canonical noun incorporation. They allow the formation of words with a semantic content that correspond to an entire English clause with verb, subject and object. Another argument is that the morphemes that derive denominal verbs come from historical noun incorporating constructions, which have become fossilized.

Other linguists maintain that the morphemes in question are simply derivational morphemes that allow the formation of denominal verbs. That argument is supported by the fact that the morphemes are always latched on to a nominal element. These examples illustrate how Greenlandic forms complex predicates including nominal roots:

Nouns 
Nouns are always inflected for case and number and sometimes for number and person of possessor. Singular and plural are distinguished and eight cases are used: absolutive, ergative (relative), instrumental, allative, locative, ablative, prosecutive (also called vialis or prolative) and equative. Case and number are marked by a single suffix. Nouns can be derived from verbs or from other nouns by a number of suffixes: - "to read" + - "place" becomes  "school" and  + - "something good" becomes  "good school".

Since the possessive agreement suffixes on nouns and the transitive agreement suffixes on verbs in a number of instances have similar or identical shapes, there is even a theory that Greenlandic distinguishes between transitive and intransitive nouns as it does for verbs.

Pronouns 
There are personal pronouns for first, second, and third person singular and plural. They are optional as subjects or objects but only when the verbal inflection refers to such arguments.

Personal pronouns are, however, required in the oblique case:

Case 
Both grammatical core cases, ergative and absolutive, are used to express grammatical and syntactical roles of participant noun phrases. The oblique cases express information related to movement and manner.

The instrumental case is versatile. It is used for the instrument with which an action is carried out, for oblique objects of intransitive verbs (also called antipassive verbs) and for secondary objects of transitive verbs.

There is no case marking if the noun is incorporated. Many sentences can be constructed oblique object as well as incorporated object.

It is also used to express the meaning of "give me" and to form adverbs from nouns:

The allative case describes movement towards something.

It is also used with numerals and the question word qassit to express the time of the clock and in the meaning "amount per unit":

The locative case describes spatial location:

The ablative case describes movement away from something or the source of something:

The prosecutive case describes movement through something and the medium of writing or a location on the body. It is also used to describe a group of people such as a family as belonging to the modified noun.

The equative case describes similarity of manner or quality. It is also used to derive language names from nouns denoting nationalities: "like a person of x nationality [speaks]".

Possession 

In Greenlandic, possession is marked on the noun that agrees with the person and the number of its possessor. The possessor is in the ergative case. There are different possessive paradigms for each different case. Table 4 gives the possessive paradigm for the absolutive case of  "house". Here are examples of the use of the possessive inflection, the use of the ergative case for possessors and the use of fourth person possessors.

Numerals 

The numerals and lower numbers are,

Vocabulary 

Most of Greenlandic's vocabulary is inherited from Proto-Eskimo–Aleut, but there are also a large number of loans from other languages, especially from Danish. Early loans from Danish have often become acculturated to the Greenlandic phonological system: the Greenlandic word  "priest" is a loan from the Danish . However, since Greenlandic has an enormous potential for the derivation of new words from existing roots, many modern concepts have Greenlandic names that have been invented rather than borrowed:  "computer" which literally means "artificial brain". The potential for complex derivations also means that Greenlandic vocabulary is built on very few roots, which, combined with affixes, form large word families. For example, the root for "tongue"  is used to derive the following words:
 'says'
 'word'
 'speaks'
 'discussion paper'
 'linguist'
 'grammar'
 'author'
 'conversation'
 'harangues him'
 'speaks badly about him'

Lexical differences between dialects are often considerable because of the earlier cultural practice of imposing a taboo on words that had served as names for a deceased person. Since people were often named after everyday objects, many of them have changed their name several times because of taboo rules, another cause of the divergence of dialectal vocabulary.

Orthography 
Greenlandic is written with the Latin script. The alphabet consists of 18 letters:
 A E F G I J K L M N O P Q R S T U V
 are used to spell loanwords, especially from Danish and English. Greenlandic uses "..." and »...« as quotation marks.

In the Kleinschmidt alphabet, long vowels and geminate consonants were indicated by diacritics on vowels (in the case of consonant gemination, the diacritics were placed on the vowel preceding the affected consonant). For example, the name Kalaallit Nunaat was spelled Kalâdlit Nunât. This scheme uses the circumflex (◌̂) to indicate a long vowel (e.g. ;), an acute accent (◌́) to indicate gemination of the following consonant: (i.e. ;) and, finally, a tilde (◌̃) or a grave accent (◌̀), depending on the author, indicates vowel length and gemination of the following consonant (e.g. ;). , used only before , are now written  in Greenlandic. The spelling system of Nunatsiavummiutut, spoken in Nunatsiavut in northeastern Labrador, is derived from the old Greenlandic system.

Technically, the Kleinschmidt orthography focused upon morphology: the same derivational affix would be written in the same way in different contexts, despite its being pronounced differently in different contexts. The 1973 reform replaced this with a phonological system: Here, there was a clear link from written form to pronunciation, and the same suffix is now written differently in different contexts: for example  do not represent separate phonemes, but only more open pronunciations of   before  . The differences are due to phonological changes. It is therefore easy to go from the old orthography to the new (cf. the online converter) whereas going the other direction would require a full lexical analysis.

Example text
Article 1 of the Universal Declaration of Human Rights in Greenlandic:

(Pre-reform)

(Post-reform)

Article 1 of the Universal Declaration of Human Rights in English:
"All human beings are born free and equal in dignity and rights. They are endowed with reason and conscience and should act towards one another in a spirit of brotherhood."

See also 

 Inuit languages
 Inuit grammar
 Inuit phonology

Notes

Abbreviations
For affixes about which the precise meaning is the cause of discussion among specialists, the suffix itself is used as a gloss, and its meaning must be understood from context: -SSA (meaning either future or expectation), -NIKUU and -SIMA.

4:fourth (reflexive or obviative) person
PART:participial mood
EQU:equative case
CONT:contemporative mood
INT:intransitive
INSTR:instrumental case
POSS:possessor
CAU:causative mood

References

Sources

Further reading 
 Fortescue, M. D. (1990). From the writings of the Greenlanders = Kalaallit atuakkiaannit. [Fairbanks, Alaska]: University of Alaska Press.

External links 

 General Usage of the Greenlandic Language Papers at Dartmouth College Library
 Oqaasileriffik (The Greenland Language Secretariat) (version in English)

 
Inuit languages
Languages of Greenland
Indigenous languages of the North American Arctic
Indigenous languages of the Americas
Agglutinative languages
Languages of Denmark
Indigenous languages of North America